Falls of Balgy is a waterfall near Torridon in Scotland.

See also
Waterfalls of Scotland

References

Waterfalls of Scotland